Timoteo Briet Montaud (Cocentaina, March 3, 1859 – Alcoy, January 30, 1925) was a Spanish architect, one of the main architects of the Art Nouveau in Alcoy and the Valencian Art Nouveau.

Biography 
In 1876 he finishes his studies in Alcoy's Industrial Elementary School. Between 1882 and 1883 he ends his studies in the Barcelona Official School of Fine arts. In 1890 finishes the architect's career in the Barcelona School of Architecture.

In 1893 Timoteo Briet marries with Maria Valor Boronat. In 1902 he is nominated municipal architect of Alcoy, by public contest.

The Timoteo Briet's art nouveau style will be contained, rather formally and especially with a great influence of the Austrian art nouveau movement Secession, influence that it is present in all his art nouveau works. Along his career he realized more than 40 works and architectural interventions, practically all of them in Alcoy. He die in 1925, in Alcoy.

Works 
Relation of works by chronological order:
 Iglesia del convento de las Carmelitas en calle El Camí número 42, in Alcoy. (1891).
 Estación del Ferrocarriles de Villena a Alcoy y Yecla, in Bocairent (Alicante). (1892).
 Capilla de la Comunión, in Banyeres de Mariola (Alicante). (1897).
 Fábrica "El Vulcano" en calle Els Alçamora 17–19, in Alcoy. (1899).
 Casa en calle Sant Nicolau 32, in Alcoy. (1901).
 Convento e iglesia de las Siervas de María en la calle Cordeta número 12, in Alcoy. (1904).
 Casa Laporta, in Alcoy (1904).
 Cocheras en plaza Emili Sala 12, in Alcoy. (1905).
 Viviendas en calle Bartolomé José Gallardo 1, 3 y 5, in Alcoy. (1905).
 Taller de la estación, in Banyeres de Mariola (Alicante). Obra realizada para el industrial alcoyano José Laporta Valor. (1905).
 Edificio en calle Sant Nicolau número 25, in Alcoy (1907). 
 Casa en calle El Camí número 1, en Alcoy (1907). 
 Edificio en calle Sant Nicolau 35 de Alcoy (1908).
 Edificio en calle Sant Josep 26, in Alcoy. (1908).
 Building in 20, Pintor Casanova Street, in Alcoy. (1908).
 Fachada y salón del Circulo Industrial de Alcoy. (1909–1911).
 Taller de carruajes en calle Agres número 5, in Alcoy. (1909).
 Casa Briet, in 24 Sant Josep Street, in Alcoy. (1910).
 Casa particular en esquina de la calle Casablanca, in Alcoy (1910).
 Edificio en la calle Sant Llorenç número 3, in Alcoy. (1910).
 House of Francisco Masanet in Agres Street number 3, in Alcoy (1910).
 Subestación de Hidroeléctrica de Alcoy (1910).
 Pantheon of Vilaplana Gisbert in the Alcoy Cemetery, (1910).
 Casa en calle Capellà Belloch número 9, en Alcoy. (1910–1911).
 Chalet junto a la subestación de Hidroeléctrica en la calle Colón número 3, en Alcoy. (1911).
 Matadero municipal de Alcoy (1911).
 Casa en avenida del País Valencià número 17, en Alcoy. (1913).
 Saint George's church, in Alcoy (1913).
 Casa en calle Joan Cantó número 6, in Alcoy. (1914).
 Fábrica de "El Rosendo" en calle Sant Vicent Ferrer número 14, in Alcoy. (1914).
 Ermita en el Molí Sol, en Banyeres (Alicante). (1914). Actualmente ubicada en el cementerio de Banyeres.
 Fábricas en calle Sant Joan números 43 y 45, in Alcoy. (1915).
 Casa y fábrica en calle Sant Vicent Ferrer número 12, in Alcoy (1915).
 Viviendas en calle Pintor Casanova números 16 y 18, in Alcoy. (1915).
 Casa en plaza Gonçal Cantó número 22, in Alcoy (1918).
 Casa en calle Sant Tomàs número 21, in Alcoy (1918).
 Casa en calle Mossen Torregrosa número 11, in Alcoy (1919).
 Edificio en calle Sant Nicolau número 44, in Alcoy (1920).
 Edificio en avenida del País Valencià número 14, in Alcoy. (1921).
 Reforma de edificio en la plaza de España número 17, in Alcoy. (1924).

References

Bibliography 
 Doménech Romá, Jorge (2010). Modernismo en Alcoy, su contexto histórico y los oficios artesanales. Editorial Aguaclara. pp. 293–294. .
 Doménech Romá, Jorge (2013). Del Modernismo al Funcionalismo, características y evolución del movimiento modernista, el modernismo en Alcoy y Novelda (casos concretos). Publicaciones de la Universidad de Alicante. p. 224. .
 Jaén i Urban, Gaspar (1999). Instituto de Cultura Juan Gil-Albert, Colegio Territorial de Arquitectos de Alicante, ed. Guía de arquitectura de la provincia de Alicante. p. 14. .

External links 

 Biography at the Art Nouveau European Route
 Biography at "El Patrimonio Modernista de Alcoi" of Jordi Ortiz Carbonell

Architects from the Valencian Community
Art Nouveau architects in the Valencian Community
20th-century Spanish architects
People from Alcoy
1859 births
1925 deaths